The 1980–81 Hellenic Football League season was the 28th in the history of the Hellenic Football League, a football competition in England.

Premier Division

The Premier Division featured 14 clubs which competed in the division last season, along with two new clubs, promoted from Division One:
Hazells
Maidenhead Town

League table

Division One

The Division One featured 12 clubs which competed in the division last season, along with 4 new clubs:
Clanfield, relegated from the Premier Division
Worrall Hill, relegated from the Premier Division
Lydney Town, joined from the Gloucestershire Northern Senior League
Viking Sports, joined from the Middlesex League

League table

References

External links
 Hellenic Football League

1980-81
8